Pavelas Fedorenka (born October 5, 1964 in Anykščiai, Lithuania) is a retired male long-distance runner from Lithuania. He competed for his native Baltic country in the men's marathon event at the 1996 Summer Olympics in Atlanta, Georgia, finishing in 70th place (2:25.41). The other two competitors for Lithuania in this race, Česlovas Kundrotas and Dainius Virbickas, did not finish. Fedorenka set his personal best and national record in the men's 1,500 metres distance on 7 June 1987 in Moscow, clocking 3.40,90.

Achievements

See also
Lithuanian records in athletics

References
 

1964 births
Living people
Soviet male middle-distance runners
Lithuanian male long-distance runners
Athletes (track and field) at the 1996 Summer Olympics
Olympic athletes of Lithuania
People from Anykščiai